Araqi may refer to:

 Araqi (drink), a date-gin brewed in Sudan
 Araqi, Iran, a village in North Khorasan Province
 Fakhr-al-Din Iraqi or Araqi (1213–1289), Sufi writer

See also
Arax (disambiguation)
Araki (disambiguation)
Arrakis (disambiguation)